SERA Architects is an American architectural firm headquartered in Portland, Oregon, with a second office in Oakland, California. It is the fifth largest architecture firm in Portland, offering architectural, interior design, and urban design and planning services. Founded in Portland in 1968 by Architect Bing Sheldon, who led the Portland Downtown Plan to revitalize the city’s urban core, the firm’s early work focused on historic renovations and adaptive reuse projects. In 2015, SERA opened a second office in Mountain View, California.

The firm is known for its research and implementation of sustainable design. In 2014 and 2015, two of its projects were named among the top ten greenest in the U.S. by the American Institute of Architects. Another notably green project of SERA’s includes the Oregon Sustainability Center - a joint venture with GBD Architects, which was proposed as Portland’s first large-scale Zero-energy building.

Works 

 Admiral Apartments renovation, Portland, OR  
 Argyle Winery Tasting House, Dundee, OR
 Burnside 26 apartments, Portland, OR
 The Collaborative Life Sciences Building and Skourtes Tower, Portland, OR 
 Sisters, Oregon Cascade Avenue streetscape plan, Sisters, OR
 Edith Green – Wendell Wyatt Federal Building renovation (with Cutler-Anderson Architects) Portland, OR  
 Erb Memorial Union renovation and addition at the University of Oregon, Eugene, OR  
 Hotel Alder renovation, Portland, OR  
 Inlow Hall renovation, La Grande, OR  
 The Nines (hotel) Hotel (aka the Meier & Frank Building), Portland, OR  
 Oregon Department of Transportation headquarters renovation, Salem, OR  
 Oregon Sustainability Center, Portland, OR 
 Pearl District Residence Inn, Portland, OR 
 Pioneer Courthouse renovation, Portland, OR  
 Portland Art Museum’s Mark Building renovation (with Ann Beha Architects), Portland, OR  
 Portland City Hall (Oregon) renovation, Portland, OR  
 Quinn Coliseum at Eastern Oregon University, La Grande, OR  
 Sokol Blosser Winery Wine Barrel Facility, Dundee, OR   
 Washington High School redevelopment, Portland, OR  
 Weatherford Hall renovation at Oregon State University, Corvallis, OR

References

External links 
 SERA Architects website
 Architect Magazine firm profile

1968 establishments in Oregon
Architecture firms based in Oregon
Companies based in Portland, Oregon
Design companies established in 1968